Raymond Sarmiento (born July 24, 1992) is an American professional tennis player.

Sarmiento has a career high ATP singles ranking of 287 achieved on September 11, 2017. He also has a career high ATP doubles ranking of 386 achieved on March 7, 2016.

Sarmiento made his ATP main draw debut at the 2019 Winston-Salem Open after qualifying for the singles main draw, defeating Christopher Eubanks and Daniel Nguyen. He lost against Jérémy Chardy.

Hitting partner
In May 2022 he began working as Emma Raducanu's hitting partner, with plans to continue through the 2022 French Open in Paris.

References

External links
 
 

1992 births
Living people
American male tennis players
Sportspeople from Glendale, California
American sportspeople of Filipino descent
Tennis people from California
USC Trojans men's tennis players